Absolutely Fabulous (also known as Ab Fab) is a British television sitcom based on the French and Saunders sketch, "Modern Mother and Daughter", created by Dawn French and Jennifer Saunders. The show was created and written by Saunders, who also stars as one of the main characters with Joanna Lumley and Julia Sawalha.

The series features Edina Monsoon, a heavy-drinking, drug-abusing PR agent who spends her time failing to lose weight and chasing bizarre fads in a desperate attempt to stay young and "hip". Edina is joined by magazine fashion director Patsy Stone, whose drug abuse, alcohol consumption and desperate promiscuity far eclipse Edina's. Edina is reliant upon the support of her daughter Saffron, a student and aspiring writer whose constant care of her immature mother has left her a bitter cynic. The series also stars June Whitfield in a supporting role as Edina's dotty, sarcastic, and often thieving mother who appears in nearly every episode. Jane Horrocks as Edina's utterly brainless personal assistant Bubble also features frequently.

The first three series of Absolutely Fabulous were broadcast on the BBC from 1992 to 1995, followed by a series finale in the form of a two-part special entitled The Last Shout, in 1996. In 2000, the show was ranked number 17 on the 100 Greatest British Television Programmes by the British Film Institute. It was revived for two more series and two one-hour specials, airing from 2001 to 2004. Three new episodes, collectively titled Absolutely Fabulous: 20th Anniversary, were released in 2011-2012. Two sketches for charity specials were also released, for Comic Relief in 2005, and Sport Relief in 2012. A film version of the show, Absolutely Fabulous: The Movie, was released to theaters in 2016. On 29 November 2016 Saunders confirmed that she is "not doing anything more with Ab Fab", as she wanted to focus on new projects.

Premise
Edina "Eddie" Monsoon (Saunders) and Patricia "Patsy" Stone (Lumley) are a pair of high-powered career women on the London fashion scene. Eddie runs her own PR firm, and Patsy holds a sinecure position at a top British fashion magazine.

The two women use their considerable financial resources to indulge in cigarettes, alcohol and recreational drugs and to chase the latest fads in an attempt to maintain their youth and recapture their glory days as Mods in swinging London. The partnership is largely driven by Patsy, who is both co-dependent and an enabler to Eddie.

Their lifestyle inevitably leads to a variety of personal crises, which are invariably resolved by Eddie's daughter, Saffron "Saffy" Monsoon (Sawalha), whose constant involvement in their exploits has left her increasingly bitter and cynical.

Eddie's mother is also present in their routines, often helping Saffy with the cooking and cleaning at home; despite this, though, Eddie and Mother have a strained relationship, rarely being left alone together and disagreeing on virtually everything.

Also recurring in their lives are both of Eddie's ex-husbands, Marshall and Justin, and their respective new partners, the American hippie Bo, and the acidic antique dealer Oliver.

Production

Development
Absolutely Fabulous evolved from a French and Saunders sketch called "Modern Mother and Daughter" (from series 3 episode 6), which starred Saunders as the mother (named Adrianna) and French as the daughter, already named Saffron. The sketch revolved around a middle-aged, single mother who acted like a teenager, and was reliant upon the emotional and financial support of her teenage daughter, who behaved like a middle-aged woman.

It has no connection, other than the character's name, to the earlier film, Eddie Monsoon: A Life?, a comedy play written by Saunders' husband Adrian Edmondson in 1984 for the TV series, The Comic Strip Presents.... The name "Edina Monsoon" is derived from Edmondson's name and "Eddy Monsoon" is a nickname of his.

Saunders revealed in 2012 that she was inspired by pop band Bananarama, with whom she and Dawn French had become friends after their Comic Relief collaboration in 1989.

"The nights with Bananarama were some of the best nights of my life, and I got a lot of gags from Bananarama because they were big vodka drinkers...when I started doing AbFab, I remembered all of the falls that I saw Bananarama do. I once saw one of them coming out of a cab bottom first and hitting the road, and I thought 'that's class'".

Although Ab Fab was produced by Saunders and French's company, Saunders & French Productions, Dawn French appeared on the show only once, in a cameo in the first-series episode "Magazine", before making a brief cameo in the 2016 film. French was originally intended to play Edina's daughter, Saffron.

The first three series were broadcast on the BBC from 1992 to 1995, followed by a series finale in the form of a two-part television film entitled The Last Shout in 1996. Saunders revived the show for a fourth series in 2001, after having written and submitted a pilot entitled Mirrorball, which recruited nearly all of the original cast in new roles. The pilot was intended to be turned into a series of episodes. However, Saunders felt the characters were too rich and interesting to put aside, and were far better suited for her new story ideas. Instead of Mirrorball, a new series of Absolutely Fabulous was proposed to the BBC, which later commissioned the fourth series in 2001. From 2001 to 2004, two full series were produced, along with two one-off hour-long specials; Gay (retitled and issued as Absolutely Fabulous in New York for the United States) in 2002, and White Box (another series finale), which aired in 2004. A Comic Relief sketch was broadcast in 2005.

In November 2010, Lumley revealed to Playbill magazine that she had recently spoken to Saunders about the possibility of filming a new series. Lumley and Saunders reunited for the M&S Christmas advert in 2009, along with other stars such as Twiggy and Stephen Fry.
In August 2011, Lumley confirmed the planned filming of three new episodes. In 2011, plans for a 20th anniversary revival were welcomed in The Guardian, which applauded the show as "prophetic". The first new special of Absolutely Fabulous: 20th Anniversary was broadcast on 25 December with the second episode being shown on 1 January 2012. The third and final special, aired on 23 July 2012, coincided with the 2012 Summer Olympics in London, with Stella McCartney appearing in a cameo role. A sketch for Sport Relief was also broadcast in 2012. A film version of the series, Absolutely Fabulous: The Movie, was released to theaters in the summer of 2016.

Three new specials were announced to celebrate the show's 20th anniversary with the first special, "Identity" airing on 25 December 2011. Jon Plowman, executive producer and original producer of the series, said: "Viewers have been fantastically loyal in their devotion to our show, so we're really thrilled to say that it's coming back for three new shows to celebrate our 20th anniversary. All of the originals who are back together again are still truly absolutely fabulous and the new adventures of Edina, Patsy, Saffy, Bubble and Mother, plus a few surprising guests, will be a real treat for viewers." Saunders announced in November 2011 that she had begun work on a film version of the series.

In the United States, the episodes were jointly co-produced by Logo, and BBC America in the US. and aired in January 2012 for broadcast by both BBC America and Logo Channel. Both channels also co-produced the 20th Anniversary episodes, although Logo removed some scenes for its airings. BBC America broadcast it in full. Both channels aired the episode in a 40-minute block to allow for commercial interruptions.

On 3 January 2012, following the success of the 20th anniversary specials, it was rumoured that Saunders was set to write another Christmas special for 2012. The BBC were rumoured to also be urging her to write a sixth series for 2013. Saunders denied the reports of additional episodes via her Twitter account.

Episodes of Absolutely Fabulous were shot in front of a live studio audience.

Theme song
The theme song for Absolutely Fabulous is "This Wheel's on Fire", written by Bob Dylan and Rick Danko and performed by Julie Driscoll and Saunders' Comic Strip fellow and later husband, Adrian Edmondson. The song was also sung by Marianne Faithfull and P. P. Arnold for the two-part special, "The Last Shout", in 1996. Hermine Demoriane sang the theme song with a French accent over the closing credits of the series 4 episode "Paris" in 2001. At the end of the series 1 episode "Birthday", Edina and Patsy sang the song together on a karaoke machine. It was later performed by Debbie Harry and Edmondson in the 2002 Christmas special "Gay" (where Harry also guest-starred), as well as in series 5. For series 4, a line sung by David Bowie, "Ziggy played guitar", from his song "Ziggy Stardust", played at the end of each episode.

Due to copyright issues, the theme song is missing from many of the US Region 1 DVDs, being replaced by an instrumental version of the song. Also excised from the US DVD release is the musical number from Chicago performed by Horrocks, Gaffney, and Ryan, during a dream sequence in the series 5 episode "Birthin'".

In addition to the official theme song, in 1994, Pet Shop Boys recorded a song for Comic Relief using excerpts of dialogue from the series put to dance music. The single was attributed to "Absolutely Fabulous produced by Pet Shop Boys". It peaked at number six on the UK Singles Chart in July 1994. The music video featured clips from the show and specially recorded footage of the Pet Shop Boys with Patsy and Edina.

On 10 June 2016, Kylie Minogue released a cover version of "This Wheel's on Fire" for the soundtrack to Absolutely Fabulous: The Movie, prior to the film's release in July 2016.

Conclusion
On 29 November 2016, Jennifer Saunders confirmed that "She was done" with Absolutely Fabulous and it would not be returning to television for another series, or specials, nor would a sequel to the film be made. Saunders said that she wished to focus on new projects and spend more time with her family. Even so, as soon after that as 2018, Saunders, when asked about the prospect of reviving the programme yet again, did not completely dismiss it, saying "I am thinking at the moment of writing a little something. It has to be age-appropriate otherwise we’d have to be in wheelchairs basically. I think Julia is old enough to be my mother now." Saunders said the prospect of writing new stories with those characters was "always on [her] mind, always".

In November 2020, Joanna Lumley was asked about the possibility of another revival and said that that would be up to Saunders. Lumley said it was unlikely, as in her view Saunders did not seem to want to work on new stories featuring the characters at that time. Lumley said that June Whitfield's death in December 2018 also meant it was less likely to happen, but said if Saunders wished to write new Ab Fab stories, she would be up for returning to play Patsy; she said "wait and see".

Cast and characters

Main
Jennifer Saunders as Edina "Eddie" Monsoon
Joanna Lumley as Patricia "Patsy" Stone
Julia Sawalha as Saffron "Saffy" Monsoon
Jane Horrocks as Bubble
June Whitfield as Mother

Recurring and guest 
Christopher Ryan as Marshall Turtle
Mo Gaffney as Bo Turtle (née Crysalis)
Christopher Malcolm as Justin
Naoko Mori as Sarah
Helen Lederer as Catriona
Harriet Thorpe as Fleur
Gary Beadle as Oliver
 Kathy Burke as Magda
Miranda Richardson as Bettina
Patrick Barlow as Max
Jane Horrocks as Katy Grin
Celia Imrie as Claudia Bing
Eleanor Bron as Patsy's Mother
Tilly Blackwood as Lady Candy Bender
Antony Cotton as Damon
Felix Dexter as John Johnson

Special guests
Many celebrities, mainly British or American, appeared in the series, most of them as themselves. They include:

Sylvia Anderson
Christopher Biggins
Crispin Bonham Carter
Helena Bonham Carter
Jo Brand
Fern Britton
Simon Brodkin
Emma Bunton
Danny Burstein
Naomi Campbell
Linford Christie
Nicky Clarke
Terence Conran
Richard Curtis
Carl Davis
Daniela Denby-Ashe
Marcella Detroit
Sacha Distel
James Dreyfus
Minnie Driver
Lindsay Duncan
Adrian Edmondson
Britt Ekland
Idris Elba
Marianne Faithfull
Jesse Tyler Ferguson
Dawn French
Mariella Frostrup
Stephen Gately
Jean-Paul Gaultier
Whoopi Goldberg
Dave Gorman
Sofie Gråbøl
Richard E Grant
Germaine Greer
Tanni Grey-Thompson
Debbie Harry
Miranda Hart
Rebecca Front
Josh Hamilton (actor)
David Haye
Tom Hollander
Kelly Holmes
Colin Jackson
Elton John
Mark Kermode
La Roux
Christian Lacroix
Nathan Lane
Leigh Lawson
Robert Lindsay
Lulu
Stella McCartney
Suzy Menkes
Laurie Metcalf
Kate Moss
Graham Norton
Erin O'Connor
Bruce Oldfield
Kate O'Mara
Anita Pallenberg
Suzi Quatro
Zandra Rhodes
Mandy Rice-Davies
Richard and Judy
Kristin Scott Thomas
Meera Syal
Twiggy
Rufus Wainwright
Kirsty Wark
Ruby Wax
Dale Winton
Katy Wix
Natascha McElhone
Clarissa Dickson Wright

International broadcast

Europe 
In Portugal, Ab Fab has been shown on RTP2. In Serbia, the first series was aired in 1998, through a network of local television stations. In 2004 the series was aired in its entirety on B92, while in the Czech Republic all episodes have been shown. In North Macedonia, all episodes have been shown a couple of times on Sitel. In the Netherlands and Flanders, the series is popular, still being regularly re-broadcast by the VPRO and Canvas, respectively. In Sweden, all episodes were first broadcast by SVT, but reruns have later appeared on other channels. In Germany, it was broadcast by the Franco-German TV network Arte and gay-oriented channel TIMM. In France, before it was rerun on terrestrial TV arte, it was successively premiered on pay TV channel Canal +, cable channel Jimmy, and is now broadcast on France 4. In Finland, the series was broadcast by YLE TV1. In Estonia, the series was broadcast by ETV. In Poland, two series were broadcast by Wizja Jeden, later by TVP3, TVN7 and BBC Entertainment.

Australia/Oceania 
In Australia, all series were originally shown on the ABC, and on cable on UK.TV, and moved to The Comedy Channel in 2007. Repeats of the first three series were also shown on the Seven network. The ABC continues to show it sporadically and shows Christmas Specials and occasional repeats of series 5 episodes. ABC2 also shows repeats of the show. As of 6–7 August 2016, the series was shown on Nine Network's sister channel 9Gem to promote the upcoming film adaption. In New Zealand all five series were broadcast on TVNZ. In India, all five series, including the specials, have been shown on BBC Entertainment.

North America 
In the United States, Absolutely Fabulous premiered on 24 July 1994 on Comedy Central with a 12-episode marathon. It has also been broadcast by some public television stations, but not as part of the PBS program offerings, BBC America, Oxygen Network, and as of 2011, Logo, a gay-oriented channel. In Canada, the programme has appeared on the BBC Canada, the CBC, The Comedy Network and VisionTV. In the United States at April 2021, the entire series is being included with Amazon’s Prime streaming service; while listed slightly differently, e.g., ‘Season 5” adds the final three episodes from 2011 to the British series 5 from 2003-2004, all episodes are available with a Prime membership. It is also available on the Britbox streaming service.

Other 
In Israel, some of the series was aired on Yes Plus and on BBC Entertainment. In Brazil, all episodes have been aired on Eurochannel & Multishow at late 90's & 2000's beginning, and in 2010's at GNT.

Episodes

Reception

Critical reception

Tim Gray of Variety magazine said that "Absolutely Fabulous, British sitcom about a rich, self-absorbed, falling-down-drunk woman, is not as funny as it intends to be, but it is absolutely unique, absolutely rude and absolutely politically incorrect". He also said that "AbFab offers no sense of justice, which may give viewers the heebie-jeebies, since Americans like to believe that the wicked, even if they are amusing, will get punished. But the characters are originals, and AbFab has the courage of its convictions, encouraging audiences to find humor in such recent comedic taboos as substance abuse or mistreated offspring."

Michael Hogan of The Daily Telegraph gave the 20th Anniversary specials a negative review; following the "Olympics" episode, he commented, "The special Olympic edition of Absolutely Fabulous [...] would have won no medals for comedy." He added, "This was the last of three 20th anniversary specials, the first pair of which were shown over Christmas. Every single one of those 20 years showed on-screen during this torturous half-hour."

In a more favourable review, Meredith Blake of The A.V. Club stated, "While longtime AbFab fans will enjoy this latest incarnation of the series, which has been reprised multiple times since its official end in 1995, 'Identity' most definitely isn't for AbFab neophytes, who will most likely be confused by the broad performances, the outré costumes, and the disembodied canned laughter."

Ratings

Cultural impact
In 2000, Absolutely Fabulous was ranked as the 17th greatest British television show of all time by the British Film Institute (BFI). In 1997, the pilot episode, "Fashion", was ranked #47 on TV Guides "100 Greatest Episodes of All-Time" list. A scene from the show was included in the TV's 100 Greatest Moments programme broadcast by Channel 4 in 1999. In 2004 and 2007, the show was ranked #24 and #29 on TV Guides "Top Cult Shows Ever" list. In 2019, the series ranked #9 in Radio Times' top 20 British sitcoms of all time. Absolutely Fabulous has a 96% rating on Rotten Tomatoes.

From its very earliest series, Absolutely Fabulous won a devoted cult status with gay audiences, which persists to this day. There have been numerous tributes over the years, such as an Absolutely Fabulous drag show at Sydney Gay and Lesbian Mardi Gras, and the song "Absolutely Fabulous" by synth-pop duo Pet Shop Boys. Later series of the show leaned in to its cult status, including more gay-related storylines, such as Edina's search for her estranged gay son, and Edina and Patsy marrying each other in a same-sex commitment ceremony.

Adaptations and related media
A proposed American remake that would have starred Carrie Fisher and Barbara Carrera was put into motion by Roseanne Barr, but never materialised. However, Barr did incorporate many elements of the show into the ninth season of her eponymous show Roseanne, in which her character wins the lottery: Saunders and Lumley reprised their characters Edina and Patsy, and Mo Gaffney also appeared in the episode, though not as her character Bo. Two later American sitcoms, Cybill and High Society, also adapted elements of Absolutely Fabulous for the American audience.

It was announced on 7 October 2008 that an American version of the series was in the works. The series was to be relocated to Los Angeles. Saturday Night Live writer Christine Zander worked on the new scripts and would have been executive producer along with Saunders and BBC Worldwide's Ian Moffitt. Sony Pictures Television, BBC Worldwide, and indie Tantamount were producing the new series for Fox, which greenlighted the pilot as a possible Fall 2009 entry with Kathryn Hahn as Eddy and Kristen Johnston as Patsy. In May 2009, Fox decided not to commission a full series.

The stage for the kitchen in Ab Fab was subsequently used as the stage for the shop in the British comedy Miranda. Miranda Hart, creator of the show, had previously appeared on Absolutely Fabulous.

Mirrorball
Mirrorball was a pilot set in the London theatre scene, starring the cast of Absolutely Fabulous as alternative characters. While writing and filming the show, Saunders was inspired to revive Absolutely Fabulous for a fourth series, which resulted in her abandoning Mirrorball. It was eventually aired as a television special, and is included as a special feature on the DVD of the fourth series. Some characters original to Mirrorball feature in the fourth series.

Absolument fabuleux
A French film inspired by Absolutely Fabulous, titled Absolument fabuleux, was released in 2001. It was written and directed by Gabriel Aghion, and starred Josiane Balasko as Eddy and Nathalie Baye as Patsy. Saunders had a small cameo alongside Catherine Deneuve as a spectator at a fashion show. Amanda Lear was asked to play the part of Patsy but turned it down laughingly, saying she had "already lived it".

Absolutely Fabulous: The Movie

In 2011, prior to the release of the new episodes for 2011/2012, Deadline Hollywood reported that Saunders planned to begin writing a script for a film of Absolutely Fabulous in 2012. The film would begin with Edina and Patsy waking up on an oligarch's deserted yacht, drifting in the ocean. Saunders later said that the film will be set on the French Riviera. In March 2012, Saunders confirmed that she was working on the script. She said of the film's plotline:

Saunders also stated that now that she had announced plans for a feature, there was no going back. She would do it for no other reason than to have her alter-ego and Patsy walk down the red carpet at the film's premiere. In April 2013 Saunders said on the Alan Carr Chatty Man show that she had doubts about the film as she felt the cast were "too old". She felt pressure to write it and did not want to commit herself to it at this early stage.

On 4 January 2014 whilst appearing on The Jonathan Ross Show, Saunders officially confirmed that the movie will definitely be happening, as she felt obliged to write a script for a film adaptation after threatening it for so long. Saunders was quoted as saying: "Joanna Lumley kept announcing it and saying, 'Yes she's going to do it,' and then Dawn French on our radio show at Christmas said, 'I bet £100,000 that you don't write it,' so now I have to write it, otherwise I have to pay her £100,000'". In April 2014, Saunders again confirmed on BBC Breakfast that she was in the process of writing the film, and gave a prospective release date of sometime during 2015.

Principal photography on the film began on 12 October 2015 in the south of France and it premiered in London on 29 June 2016.

Home media
Absolutely Fabulous was initially released on VHS in the UK by BBC Video ending with the eight-VHS box set Series 1–4 in November 2002. In the United States, series 1 and 2 were released together on Laserdisc by CBS/FOX in a boxed set in 1995, followed by series 3, released by CBS/FOX the following year and "The Last Shout" released by Image Entertainment in 1997. All episodes were later released on DVD, including a five-DVD box set titled The Complete DVD Collection: Series 1–4 in 2002. All releases were distributed by BBC Video and 2 Entertain (post 2004) except for The Last Shout which was released by Vision Video and Universal Studios. The entire series is also available on demand on iTunes. When the first three series were re-released on DVD, they did not include corresponding cover photography to their series: Series 1 included an image from the Series 3 episode "Jealous", Series 2 had an image from Series 3 episode "Doorhandle" and Series 3 is from the Series 2 episode "Poor". All other releases included imagery from the correct series, as do the original VHS releases.

In North America, all episodes have been released on DVD by BBC Video and Warner Home Video, including a complete collection named Absolutely Everything. The Last Shout and Gay (which were released in the UK individually) were released as a collection called Absolutely Special in 2003. Another feature-length special White Box was released exclusively to the American market. It was eventually released in the United Kingdom on 15 November 2010 with its inclusion in the Absolutely Everything box set.

Other releases include Absolutely Not, a bloopers and outtakes collection, and Absolutely Fabulous: A Life (released as "Ab Fab: Moments" in the United States exclusively to VHS), a mockumentary including 15 minutes of new material interspersed with clips from the series. Both were only released on VHS in the UK; the latter was also released as a special feature on the box set release Absolutely Everything in America.

Save for "The Last Shout", and the specials "Gay" (aka "Absolutely Fabulous in New York"), and "White Box", the entire series is available to stream via Hulu. The series is also available on Netflix.

UK VHS 
In the United Kingdom, VHS releases were distributed by BBC Video, except The Last Shout which was released by Vision Video, the final release being in 2002.

DVD releases
All episodes have now been released on DVD in the United Kingdom. "White Box", which was released in North America, was never available individually in the UK and was not available until its inclusion in the 2010 Absolutely Fabulous: Absolutely Everything box set. The North American release Absolutely Special has been released in the UK as two separate releases: The Last Shout and Gay. All releases in the UK were distributed by BBC Video except The Last Shout which was released by Vision Video.

In North America, every episode of the series has been released. All releases are distributed by BBC Video and Warner Home Video.

See also

List of Absolutely Fabulous episodes
List of British television programmes
List of programs broadcast by Comedy Central

Notes

References

External links

Absolutely Fabulous at British TV Comedy Guide
Absolutely Fabulous at Episode World

 (episode contains skit Modern Mother and Daughter)

 
1992 British television series debuts
2012 British television series endings
1990s British sitcoms
2000s British sitcoms
2010s British sitcoms
Alcohol abuse in television
BAFTA winners (television series)
BBC high definition shows
BBC television sitcoms
British television series revived after cancellation
English-language television shows
Fashion-themed television series
Narcissism in television
Television series about dysfunctional families
Television series based on comedy sketches
Television shows set in London
Television series by BBC Studios
Television shows adapted into films